Kabhi Kabhie Ittefaq Sey is an Indian Television Drama series that premiered on 3 January 2022 and aired on StarPlus and digitally available on Disney+ Hotstar which stars Yesha Rughani and Manan Joshi. Its a Hindi adaptation of Star Jalsha's Khorkuto and went off-air on 20 August 2022. Replace it Zindagi Mere Ghar Aana. It was replaced by Rajjo in its timeslot.

Cast

Main
 Yesha Rughani as Riddhima "Gungun" Kulshreshth (née Bhatnagar): Riddhesh and Maya's daughter; Garima's niece; Anubhav’s Wife ; New Chief Editor and CEO of Jeet Network (2022)
 Manan Joshi as Dr. Anubhav "Anu" Kulshreshth: Chandragupt and Sargam's son; Khushi's elder brother; Yug, Rasika and Chhavi's cousin; Gungun's Husband; Scientist of The Year (2022)

Recurring
 Kanwarjit Paintal as Charudutt "Charu" Kulshreshth: Chandragupt, Kiran and Chanchal's elder brother; Sunanda's husband; Yug and Rasika's father; Patriarch of the Kulshreshth family. (2022)
 Yamini Singh as Sunanda Kulshreshth: Charudutt's wife; Yug and Rasika's mother. (2022)
 Rajeev Kumar as Chandragupt "Chandru" Kulshreshth: Charudutt, Kiran and Chanchal's brother; Sargam's husband; Anubhav and Khushi's father. (2022)
 Nishigandha Wad as Sargam Kulshreshth: Chandragupt's wife; Anubhav and Khushi's mother. (2022)
 Mehul Nisar as Chanchal "Golu" Kulshreshth : Charudutt, Chandragupt and Kiran's brother; Divya's husband; Chhavi's father. (2022)
 Naina Gupta as Divya Kulshreshth: Chanchal's wife; Chhavi's mother. (2022)
 Delnaaz Irani as Kiran "Goli" (née Kulshreshth) : Charudutt, Chandragupt and Chanchal's sister; Yug, Rasika, Anubhav, Khushi and Chhavi's aunt; Pratyush's wife. (2022)
 Sandeep Rajora as Dr. Riddhesh Bhatnagar: Garima's brother; Maya's husband; Gungun's father. (2022) (Dead)
 Rushali Arora as Dr. Maya Bhatnagar: Riddhesh's widow; Gungun's mother. (2022)
 Shilpa Kadam as Garima Saxena (née Bhatnagar): Riddhesh's sister; Shankar's estranged wife; Akriti's mother; Gungun's aunt. (2022)
 Anuj Khurana as Yug Kulshreshth: Charudutt and Sunanda's son; Rasika's brother; Anubhav, Khushi and Chhavi's cousin; Neeti's husband. (2022)
 Sonia Sharma as Neeti Kulshreshth: Yug's wife. (2022)
 Priya Rore as Khushi Das (née Kulshreshth): Chandragupt and Sargam's daughter; Anubhav's younger sister; Yug, Rasika and Chhavi's cousin; Ankit's wife. (2022)
 Gourav Raj Puri as Ankit Das: Khushi's husband; Anubhav's brother-in-law (2022)
 Akshita Tiwari as Chhavi Kulshreshth: Chanchal and Divya's daughter; Yug, Rasika, Anubhav and Khushi's cousin; Gungun's friend. (2022)
 Riya Bhattacharjee as Dr. Akriti Saxena; Garima and Shankar's daughter; Gungun's cousin sister (2022)
 Saim Khan as Ranvijay "Ronny" Saxena: Gungun's namesake boyfriend; Mithilesh and Poonam's son. (2022)
 Romanch Mehta as Shankar Saxena: Garima's husband; Akriti's father. (2022)
 ActorsFirdaush as Rishi (2022) 
 Shivani Mahajan as Dr. Kamini: Maya's friend; Sarwar's mother. (2022)
 Sheel Verma as Dr. Sarwar: Kamini's son. (2022)
 Imran Khan  / Rohit Mehta as Pratyush: Kiran's husband (2022) / (2022)
 Abha Parmar as neighbor (2022)
 Sharik Khan as neighbor (2022)

 Siddharth Dhawan as Terrorist Group Leader (2022)
 Riyaz Panjwani as Mithilesh Saxena: Poonam's husband; Ranvijay's father (2022)
 Unknown as Poonam Saxena: Mithilesh's wife; Ranvijay's mother (2022)
 Ankit Bathla as Armaan Shah: Former Chief Editor and CEO of Jeet Network; (2022)

Guest appearances
 Ayesha Singh as Sai Joshi from Ghum Hai Kisikey Pyaar Meiin
Neil Bhatt as Virat Chavan from Ghum Hai Kisikey Pyaar Meiin

Production

Casting
The casting commenced in October 2021 and actors Delnaaz Irani and Rajiv Kumar were the first to be cast as pivotal recurring characters. Later, Mehul Nisar, Kanwarjit Paintal, Shilpa Kadam and several others actors too were roped in to play pivotal roles.

Development
The pre-production began in July 2021. Shooting commenced in October 2021 and various sequences were shot in Lucknow.

Release
The first promo was released on 1 November 2021, featuring the leads Yesha Rughani and Manan Joshi.

Soundtrack 

The song ‘Aate Jaate Khoobsurat’ was reverbed in a newer version as the title track for the show. It is sung by Shaan and Neeti Mohan.

Adaptations

References

External links
 
 Kabhi Kabhie Ittefaq Sey on Disney+ Hotstar

2022 Indian television series debuts
Indian drama television series
StarPlus original programming
Hindi-language television shows
Indian television soap operas